I Love You is the debut studio album by New Zealand musical recording artist Aaradhna released on May 8, 2006. The first single "Down Time", entered the New Zealand RIANZ Singles Chart at #4 on January 23, 2006, and peaked at #3.  The third single "I Love You Too", peaked at #5.

Track listing 
Track listing and song credits adapted from ASCAP and Spotify.

Charts

References

2006 debut albums
Aaradhna albums